Clifton is a neighborhood east of downtown Louisville, Kentucky USA. Clifton was named because of its hilly location on the Ohio River valley escarpment. Clifton is bounded by I-64, N Ewing Ave, Brownsboro Road, and Mellwood Ave.

History

Unlike other Louisville neighborhoods, Clifton was developed over a period of 60 years, with the first homes built in the 1860s sitting next to homes built in the 1910s, although nearly all homes were built in Victorian styles. Its residential areas are also much less dense than other nearby areas like Butchertown or the Original Highlands. The Louisville and Lexington toll pike, which is now called Frankfort Avenue, went through the heart of the area and was lined with small shops.

The area began to revitalize in the 1990s, as numerous restaurants, boutiques, and antique shops opened up along Frankfort Avenue. Area attractions include the Kentucky School for the Blind and the American Printing House for the Blind.

Demographics

As of 2000, the population of Clifton was 2,469 , of which whites are 87.2%, blacks are 8.1%, people listed as other are 2.2%, and Hispanics are 2%. College graduates are 32.1% of the population, people without a high school degree are 22%. Females outnumber males 53.1% to 46.9%.

See also
 List of attractions and events in the Louisville metropolitan area

References

External links
Street map of Clifton
Car Free Guide to Clifton
(Louisville, Ky.)/field/coveraa/mode/exact/conn/and/order/title/ad/asc/cosuppress/0    Images of Clifton (Louisville, Ky.) in the University of Louisville Libraries Digital Collection
"Clifton: Residents Knocked 'Angora Heights' Down to Earth; Breweries Offered 'Common Beer'" — Article by Rob Cunningham of The Courier-Journal

Neighborhoods in Louisville, Kentucky
Local preservation districts in Louisville, Kentucky
National Register of Historic Places in Louisville, Kentucky
Italianate architecture in Kentucky
Queen Anne architecture in Kentucky
Historic districts on the National Register of Historic Places in Kentucky
Populated places established in the 1860s
1860s establishments in Kentucky